Chupp is a 1997 Hindi-language thriller film, produced by Ramesh U Lakhiani, Keshav R Tolani under Kay Aar Films banner and directed by Ambrish Sangal. Starring Jeetendra, Om Puri, Somy Ali, Avinash Wadhavan  and music composed by Pradeep Laad. The film was a remake of 1989 Kannada thriller Tarka which was based on Agatha Christie's play The Unexpected Guest.

Plot
The film begins with a convict Rakesh Rai absconding from prison and the Police cordoning four sides of the city. During that plight, Rakesh intrudes into a house of an industrialist Keshav Narang where his wife Asha is alone. She identifies him but he threatens her and tries to hide. Then, he is dumbfounded spotting Keshav's dead body who is shortly murdered by Asha. At that point, Inspector Kadam arrives and announces the death of Keshav in a plane crash which throws Rakesh into bewilderment. After Kadam exits, Rakesh & Asha decide to facilitate because they knew the secrets of each other. 

After crossing many hurdles, they dispose of the body and return when Rakesh asks Asha about the actuality and she spins. Before marriage, Asha is in love with Avinash but Keshav exploited her poverty and knitted her. Soon after, he turns psycho and subjects her to severe domestic violence. Annoyed by it, Asha urges Avinash’s help when Keshav is out of the station. Unexpectedly, he backs under suspicion and rages against them when Avinash escapes and falls under a Police jeep. Besides, in that scrimmage, Asha stabbed Keshav to protect herself. Listening to it, Rakesh affirms her move as apt. 

The next day, in the interim of mourning, Rakesh steps in as Ashok claiming Keshav’s friend. Parallelly, Avinash wakes up in the hospital and shocks learning the death news of Keshav. Immediately, he tries to contact Asha but Rakesh silently handles the situation. Later, Asha gets anonymous threatening calls from a stranger who states her as the slayer of Keshav and seeks a huge ransom. Ashok also overhears it and pacifies Asha when she suspects Avinash. Moreover, she reveals that Avinash is only the killer. That night, in the struggle Asha locked herself in a room and after she came out spotted the dead body. Here, a puzzlement starts and Rakesh is on a serious hunt for the racketeer. Ultimately, he breaks out the mystery by identifying him as Inspector Kadam who has witnessed them while burying the body. All at once, Inspector Karve surrounds and apprehends them. 

Currently, Avinash & Asha accuse themselves when surprisingly they discover that both are guiltless. Suddenly, Rakesh pre-empts and declares himself a real homicide. Indeed, Rakesh’s wife Monica used to work for Keshav whom he tried to molest and killed. Further, he incriminated him. Hence, that night, Rakesh set foot in from the backdoor when Asha is locked, eliminated the beast, and maintained silence. Finally, the movie ends with Rakesh proceeding toward his sentence.

Cast
Jeetendra as Rakesh Rai / Ashok 
Om Puri as Keshav Narang
Somy Ali as Asha Narang
Avinash Wadhavan as Avinash
Mohan Joshi as Inspector Karve 
Dinesh Hingoo 
Fatima Sheikh

References

External links
 

1997 films
1990s Hindi-language films
1990s mystery thriller films
Hindi remakes of Kannada films
Indian mystery thriller films
Indian thriller drama films
Films based on works by Agatha Christie